Delhi Daredevils (DD) are a franchise cricket team based in Delhi, India, which plays in the Indian Premier League (IPL). They were one of the eight teams that competed in the 2009 Indian Premier League. They were captained by Virender Sehwag. Delhi Daredevils finished 3rd in the IPL and qualified for the Champions League T20.

Indian Premier League

Standings
Delhi Daredevils finished first in the league stage of IPL 2009.

Match log

Statistics

Champions League Twenty20

Group standings

Second round standings

Match log

References

2009 Indian Premier League
Delhi Capitals seasons